Brian Collins (born October 19, 1950 in Baltimore, Maryland) is an American country music artist. Between 1973 and 1974, he recorded two albums for Dot Records. In that same time span, he charted three Top 40 singles on the Billboard country charts. His highest-charting single was a #10 cover of Jack Greene's "Statue of a Fool."

Discography

Albums

Singles

References

1950 births
American country singer-songwriters
Living people
Musicians from Baltimore
Singer-songwriters from Maryland
Country musicians from Maryland